David Vines White (born 27 October 1961), a member of the Royal Household, has since 2021 served as Garter Principal King of Arms. 

The senior herald and genealogist at the College of Arms in London, as Garter King of Arms, White is responsible for the governance of the law of arms in England and Wales, the succession of peerage titles, and oversight of royal ceremonial duties.

Life

Born in Scotland, the younger son of Sheila (née Chatterton) and Peter Vines White (died 1999 at Shilton, Oxfordshire), he was educated at Marlborough College, before going up to Pembroke College, Cambridge, graduating as MA.

As an undergraduate he was elected President of the Cambridge University Heraldic and Genealogical Society. He then pursued postgraduate studies in the History of Art at the Courtauld Institute, receiving a further MA degree from the University of London.

White served as a research assistant to Theobald Mathew, Windsor Herald and contributor to Burke's Peerage & Baronetage. In 1995, he was appointed Rouge Croix Pursuivant, following in the tradition of eminent genealogists such as Sir Henry Farnham Burke and Sir Anthony Wagner.
In 2004, he was advanced Somerset Herald, and from 2014 to 2021 also served as Registrar of the College of Arms. 

On 1 July 2021, White was promoted Garter Principal King of Arms, succeeding Sir Thomas Woodcock upon his retirement. On 1 August 2021, White became Inspector of Regimental Colours within the British Army.

A member of the Council of The Heraldry Society of London (Chairman 2006–09, now Hon. FHS) and of the British Record Society, since 2010, White has served as Honorary Genealogist of the Royal Victorian Order, and is also a committee member of the Travellers' Club.
 
On 10 September 2022, as Garter King of Arms, White proclaimed the accession of Charles III from the Proclamation Gallery at St James's Palace in London before a global television audience. On 19 September 2022 he proclaimed the styles and titles of Elizabeth II over her descending coffin at the end of her committal service in St George's Chapel, Windsor.

Decorations
  2012: Queen Elizabeth II Diamond Jubilee Medal
  2021: Officer of the Most Venerable Order of the Hospital of St John of Jerusalem
  2022: Queen Elizabeth II Platinum Jubilee Medal

Arms

See also
Burke's Peerage & Baronetage
College of Arms
Heraldry

References

External links
 College of Arms website
 Debrett's People of Today

1961 births
Living people
British genealogists
People from Glasgow
People from Dunbartonshire
People educated at Marlborough College
Alumni of Pembroke College, Cambridge
Alumni of the Courtauld Institute of Art
English officers of arms
21st-century antiquarians
Garter Principal Kings of Arms